The 12046 / 45 Chandigarh-New Delhi Shatabdi Express is a Superfast Express train of the Shatabdi category belonging to Indian Railways - Northern Railway zone that runs between Chandigarh and New Delhi in India.

It operates as train number 12046 from Chandigarh to New Delhi and as train number 12045 in the reverse direction. serving the states of Chandigarh, Haryana & Delhi.

Coaches

The 12046 / 45 Chandigarh New Delhi Shatabdi Express presently has 1 Executive Class & 9 AC Chair Car coaches. It does not have a Pantry Car Coach but Dining Services are provided on the train.

As with most train services in India, Coach Composition may be amended at the discretion of Indian Railways depending on demand.

Service

The 12046 / 45 Chandigarh New Delhi Shatabdi Express covers the distance of 266 kilometres in 3 hours 20 mins (79.80 km/hr) in both directions making it the fastest train on the Chandigarh - Delhi sector.

As the average speed of the train is above 55 km/hr, as per Indian Railways rules, its fare includes a Superfast Express surcharge.

Routeing

The 12046 / 45 Chandigarh New Delhi Shatabdi Express runs from Chandigarh via Ambala Cantonment, Karnal to New Delhi.

Loco link

As the route is fully electrified, a WAP 5 or WAP 7 from the Ghaziabad shed powers the train for its entire journey.

Timings

The 12046 Chandigarh New Delhi Shatabdi Express leaves Chandigarh every day except Sunday at 12:00 hrs IST and reaches New Delhi at 15:20 hrs IST the same day.

The 12045 New Delhi Chandigarh  Shatabdi Express leaves New Delhi every day except Sunday at 19:15 hrs IST and reaches Chandigarh at 22:35 hrs IST the same day.

Gallery

External links

References 
Notes

Sources

Shatabdi Express trains
Rail transport in Haryana
Rail transport in Delhi